It Is Never Too Late to Mend is a 1913 American silent film version of the 1856 novel by Charles Reade. The film was released by the Edison Company.

References

External links

1913 films
Films based on British novels
1913 short films
1913 drama films
American silent short films
American black-and-white films
Silent American drama films
1910s American films